Events from the year 2009 in the European Union.

Incumbents
 President of the European Council
 Mirek Topolánek (Jan – May 2009)
 Jan Fischer (May – Jun 2009)
 Fredrik Reinfeldt (July – Dec 2009)
 Commission President - 
 José Manuel Barroso 
 Council Presidency -  Czech Republic (Jan – Jun 2009) and  Sweden (July – Dec 2009)

Events

January
 January 1 - Czech Republic assumes the Presidency for the first time.
 January 1 - Slovakia adopts the euro and becomes the 16th member of the Eurozone.
 January 1 - Deadline by which goods in all member states of the European Union must be sold in metric units (this has already been completed everywhere, except in the United Kingdom). Road signs in the UK are unaffected (road signs in all other member states are already in metric units).

February
 February 14 - Lithuania celebrates the millennium of its name.

May
 May 7 - Inauguration of the Eastern Partnership in Prague.

June
 June 4–7 - The 2009 European Parliament election takes place, the exact date varying depending on country. European People's Party form the largest group.
 June 7 - A referendum on changing the Act of Succession is held in Denmark.

July
 July 1 - Sweden takes over the Presidency.

September
 September 16 - President Barroso confirmed for second term by Parliament (382 to 219 with 117 abstaining)
 September 17 - Extraordinary European Council meeting in Brussels to prepare for G20 meeting.

October
 October 2 - The electorate of Ireland votes to ratify the Treaty of Lisbon.
 October 4 - Parliamentary elections in Greece.
 October 29–30 - European Council meeting in Brussels.

November
 November 22 - Presidential elections in Romania.

December
 December 1 - The Treaty of Lisbon comes into force.
 December 6 - Presidential elections run-off round in Romania

Deaths
 February 27 - Manea Mănescu, former Romanian Prime Minister (born 1916)

References

External links
 Video: What has Europe done for you in 2009?

 
Years of the 21st century in the European Union
2000s in the European Union